This is a list of Jamaican women's One-day international cricketers. Overall, 13 Jamaican women have played in at least one women's one-day international. A One Day International, or an ODI, is an international cricket match between two representative teams, each having ODI status. An ODI differs from Test matches in that the number of overs per team is limited, and that each team has only one innings. The list is arranged in the order in which each player won her first ODI cap. Where more than one player won her first ODI cap in the same match, those players are listed alphabetically by surname.

All six of Jamaica women's ODI matches were played during the 1973 Women's Cricket World Cup.

List of Jamaican ODI players

Statistics from Cricinfo.

Note:
1 These players have also played ODI cricket for the West Indies. Only their records for Jamaica are shown above.

References

Jamaica ODI
Women ODI Cricketers
Cricket